John Raymond may refer to:

Persons
 John Raymond Jr. (1665–1737), Connecticut representative
 John B. Raymond (1844–1886), Dakota Territory delegate
 John Howard Raymond (1814–1878), American university president
 John T. Raymond (1836–1887), American stage actor
 John R. Raymond, administrator at Medical College of Wisconsin
 John W. Raymond (born 1962), U.S. Space Force general
 John Raymond (MP for Reading) in 1529, MP for Reading
 John Raymond (died 1560), MP for Maldon
 John Raymond (died 1782), British Member of Parliament for Weymouth and Melcombe Regis

Other
 John Raymond science fiction magazines, published by John Raymond between 1952 and 1954

See also